Prothoracibidion is a genus of beetles in the family Cerambycidae, containing the following species:

 Prothoracibidion flavozonatum Martins, 1960
 Prothoracibidion plicatithorax Martins, 1960
 Prothoracibidion xanthopterum Martins, 1962

References

Ibidionini